Trachysomus wappesi is a species of beetle in the family Cerambycidae. It was described by Martins and Galileo in 2009. It is known from Trinidad and Tobago.

References

Onciderini
Beetles described in 2009